Cañar is a province in Ecuador. The capital is Azogues. At the time of census 2010 the province had a population of 225,184.  It contains the 16th-century ruins of Ingapirca, the best-known Inca settlement in Ecuador and a product of their conquest of the indigenous Cañari.

Cantons 
The province is divided into 7 cantons. The following table lists each with its population at the time of the 2001 census, its area in square kilometres (km²), and the name of the canton seat or capital.

3

See also 
 Ingapirca
 Cañari
 Sangay National Park
 Provinces of Ecuador
 Cantons of Ecuador

References

External links 
  Gobierno de la Provincia del Cañar, official website

 
Provinces of Ecuador